is a passenger railway station in the town of Higashiagatsuma, Gunma Prefecture, Japan, operated by East Japan Railway Company (JR East).

Lines
Yagura Station is a station on the Agatsuma Line, and is located 28.0 rail kilometers from the terminus of the line at Shibukawa Station.

Station layout

History
Yagura Station was opened on 10 November 1959. The station was absorbed into the JR East network upon the privatization of the Japanese National Railways (JNR) on 1 April 1987.

Surrounding area
 Iwashita Post Office

See also
 List of railway stations in Japan

External links

 JR East Station information 

Railway stations in Gunma Prefecture
Agatsuma Line
Stations of East Japan Railway Company
Railway stations in Japan opened in 1959
 Higashiagatsuma, Gunma